Johan Olof Widgren, né Pettersson (9 June 1907 – 6 March 1999) was a Swedish stage and film actor.  He won the Eugene O'Neill Award in 1967. He was awarded the Illis quorum by the Swedish government in 1989.

His granddaughter is actress Helena Bergström.

Selected filmography
 Ulla, My Ulla (1930)
 Perhaps a Poet (1933)
 Walpurgis Night (1935)
 Career (1938)
Home from Babylon (1941)
 Life and Death (1943)
 Young Blood (1943)
 The Sixth Shot (1943)
 Gentleman with a Briefcase (1943)
 Count Only the Happy Moments (1944)
 I Am Fire and Air (1944)
 The Serious Game (1945)
 Only a Mother (1949)
 Karin Månsdotter (1954)
 Tarps Elin (1956)
 No Tomorrow (1957)

References

External links

Male actors from Stockholm
1907 births
1999 deaths
Swedish male stage actors
Swedish male film actors
Eugene O'Neill Award winners
20th-century Swedish male actors
Recipients of the Illis quorum